Trans Studio may refer to:

Trans Studio Bandung, a shopping mall, amusement park, and hotel in Bandung, Indonesia
Trans Studio Cibubur, a shopping mall, amusement park, hotel and apartment towers in Depok, West Java, Indonesia
Trans Studio Makassar, an amusement park and development in Makassar, South Sulawesi, Indonesia
Trans Studios Samarinda, an amusement park and hotel in Samarinda, Borneo, Indonesia